Guerciotti are an Italian company that produce cyclocross, road, time trial, track and mountain bikes. Their top racing bikes "exemplify the Italian racing bicycle paradigm".

History
The company was founded in 1964 outside Milan, Italy, by brothers and former cyclocross racers, Paolo and Italo Guerciotti, with advice and assistance from Cino Cinelli. In 1976, Guerciotti began sponsoring professional road cycling teams, supplying bikes to the Fiorella Mocassini team. In the following years, teams such as Fiorella Citroën, Magniflex Fam Cucine, Santini Selle Italia, Alfa Lum cycling team, and Dromedario Sidermec rode Guerciotti bikes. During this period, the Magniflex Fam Cucine team won 5 stages in the 1979 Giro d'Italia, and finished 3rd overall with Bernt Johansson.

In 1977, Paolo Guerciotti founded the GS Guerciotti cyclocross team. This team would go on to enjoy incredible success, winning two professional and seven amateur world championships.

In 1984, Antonio Mondonico became a partner and supervised the production of about 2,000 frames a year. However, the partnership with Mondonico ended in 1989.

In 2000, Alessandro, Paolo Guerciotti's son, was officially incorporated into the company and other markets such as South Africa and Asia (Japan, Malesya, South Korea and Taiwan) were opened up. From 2005, professional teams such as L.P.R. Brakes-Farnese Vini and Androni Giocattoli-Sidermec supported. In 2008, Gilberto Simoni rode a Guerciotti in the Giro d'Italia and Alessandro Bertolini won a stage. 

From 2013 the Team CCC Development Team was supported and since 2019 the UCI ProTeam Bardiani CSF Faizanè.

Current range
Guerciotti continues to produce bicycles in the traditional manner using steel, carbon fibre and aluminium.

See also

 List of bicycle parts
 List of Italian companies

Notes and references

External links

Official Guerciotti website
Classic Rendezvous Examples

Cycle manufacturers of Italy
Mountain bike manufacturers
Italian companies established in 1964
Manufacturing companies based in Milan
Vehicle manufacturing companies established in 1964
Italian brands